Remnants is the thirteenth studio album by American country and pop singer-songwriter LeAnn Rimes. It was released in the United Kingdom and Europe on October 28, 2016. The album was released in the United States on February 3, 2017. It is the first album released by Rimes under her contract with RCA Records, following the end of her contract with Curb Records.

The first single to be released in the UK was a cover of Brandi Carlile's "The Story" on June 24, 2016. Rimes promoted the single across the UK, the first time she had promoted a single there since 2007. To promote the album, Rimes embarked on a tour, the Remnants Tour, which began in February 2017 in the UK.

Release
The album was launched in the United Kingdom and Europe on October 28, 2016. It was released on CD and as a download, in both standard and deluxe versions. It was released in the United States on February 3, 2017.

Promotion
 In 2016, Rimes performed at the televised UK concert Radio 2 Live in Hyde Park and later embarked on a 2017 UK Tour.
 Rimes performed "How to Kiss a Boy" on Strictly Come Dancing.

Singles
To promote the album, Rimes released a cover of Brandi Carlile's "The Story" as the first single in the UK on June 24, 2016. This was followed by "How to Kiss a Boy" on September 9, 2016. "Long Live Love" was released as the album's first US single on December 2, 2016. It was released to American hot adult contemporary radio on January 23, 2017.

Commercial performance
Remnants debuted at number 88 on the Billboard 200 chart dated February 25, 2017, earning 7,000 album-equivalent units in its first week, of which 6,000 were pure album sales. The album reached number 15 on the UK Albums Chart, becoming her fourth top 20 album in the country and her first since Whatever We Wanna in 2006. It is a significant improvement on her previous album, Spitfire, which peaked on the UK Chart at number 142.

Track listing

Personnel 
Credits adapted from liner notes.

 LeAnn Rimes – lead vocals, backing vocals, arrangements (1-11, 13)
 Darrell Brown – acoustic piano (1-8, 10-13), keyboards (1-13), backing vocals, arrangements (1-11, 13), additional keyboards (14)
 Mark Batson – acoustic piano (1-8, 10, 11, 13), keyboards (1-8, 10, 11, 13), arrangements (1-8, 10, 11, 13)
 Jon Hume – all instruments (14), arrangements (14)
 Michael Chaves – guitars (1-7, 9, 10, 11, 12, 13), bass (9)
 Christopher Stills – guitars (1-7, 9, 10, 11, 12, 13)
 Greg Hagan – guitars (8)
 Ray Parker Jr. – guitars (12)
 Darryl Jones – bass (1-8, 10, 11, 13)
 Willie Weeks – bass (12)
 Vinnie Colaiuta – drums (1-8, 10, 11, 13)
 Trevor Lawrence Jr. – drums (9, 14)
 Steve Jordan – drums (12), arrangements (12)
 Chris Walden – string arrangements (1)
 Rob Moose – string arrangements (3, 4, 7)
 Sharlotte Gibson – backing vocals
 Tiffany Palmer – backing vocals
 Elizabeth White – backing vocals

Production
 LeAnn Rimes – producer (1-11, 13)
 Darrell Brown – producer (1-11, 13), Pro Tools digital editing
 Mark Batson – producer (1-8, 10, 11, 13)
 Steve Jordan – producer (12)
 Jon Hume – producer (14), recording (14)
 Niko Bolas – associate producer, recording (1-8, 10-13)
 Michael Chaves – recording (9), additional recording
 Trevor Lawrence Jr. – recording (9)
 Diego Ruelas – recording (9), additional recording
 Aaron Fessell – additional recording
 Steve Genewick – additional recording
 Chandler Harrod – additional recording, assistant engineer 
 David Martinez – additional recording
 Joe Napolitano – additional recording
 Nick Rives – additional recording
 Jory Roberts – additional recording
 Alex Williams – assistant engineer 
 Ruadhri Cushnan – mixing
 Alessandro Di Camillo – mix assistant 
 Stuart Hawkes – mastering (1)
 Greg Calbi – mastering (2-14)
 Cindi Peters – production coordinator 
 Andy Hayes – design 
 Steven Sebring – photography

Charts

References

External links
 Official website

2016 albums
LeAnn Rimes albums
RCA Records albums
Albums produced by Mark Batson
Albums produced by Niko Bolas
Albums produced by Darrell Brown (musician)
Albums produced by LeAnn Rimes